Dejana Stefanović (born 5 July 1997) is a Serbian professional footballer who plays as a midfielder for English Women's Super League club Brighton & Hove Albion and the Serbia women's national team.

Career
Stefanović has been capped for the Serbia national team, appearing for the team during the 2019 FIFA Women's World Cup qualifying cycle.

In 2023, she signed for Brighton & Hove Albion on a one-and-a-half-year contract.

International goals

References

External links
 
 

1997 births
Living people
Serbian women's footballers
Serbia women's international footballers
Women's association football defenders
Sportspeople from Kragujevac
ASPTT Albi players
Avaldsnes IL players
Vålerenga Fotball Damer players
Brighton & Hove Albion W.F.C. players
Division 1 Féminine players
Toppserien players